The Journal of Plastic, Reconstructive & Aesthetic Surgery, formerly the British Journal of Plastic Surgery, is the journal of plastic surgery of the British Association of Plastic, Reconstructive and Aesthetic Surgeons. It is open access and abstracted and indexed in Scopus and other databases.

References 

Surgery journals
Plastic surgery
Open access journals
English-language journals